Phulpur is an upazila of Mymensingh District in the Division of Mymensingh, Bangladesh.

Demographics

2011 Bangladesh census, Phulpur has a population of 601,766 living in 88,708 households. Males constitute 49.48% of the population and females 50.52%. Muslims form 96.27% of the population, Hindus 3.46%, Christians 0.18%, and others 0.10%. Phulpur has a literacy rate of 37.66% for the population above age seven. After it was divided into Phulpur and Tarakanda upazilas, the residual Phulpur upazila had a population of 303,546, of which 8.44% was urban. Muslims were 294,539 and Hindus 8,112.

As of the 1991 Bangladesh census Phulpur had a population of 459,046, with males constituting 50.98% of the population and females 49.02%. This Upazila's 18+ population is 221,110. Phulpur had an average literacy rate of 72% (7+ years). compared to the national average of 32.4%.

Administration
Phulpur Upazila is divided into Phulpur Municipality and ten union parishads: Balia, Baola, Payari, Phulpur, Rahimganj, Rambhadrapur, Rupasi, Singheshwar, Chhandhara, and Bhaitkandi.

Phulpur Municipality is subdivided into 9 wards and 12 mahallas.

See also
Upazilas of Bangladesh
Districts of Bangladesh
Divisions of Bangladesh

References

Upazilas of Mymensingh District